"Bent to Fly" is a song by American hard rock guitarist Slash, featuring vocalist Myles Kennedy and backing band The Conspirators. Written by Slash and Kennedy, it was released as the second single from the guitarist's third solo album (the second with Kennedy and The Conspirators), World on Fire. The song was used as the theme song for the 2014 National Rugby League Finals series, and Slash performed the song live at ANZ Stadium as pre-show entertainment for the league's grand final that year.

Charts

Personnel
Slash – guitars
Myles Kennedy – lead vocals
Todd Kerns – bass
Brent Fitz – drums

References

2014 singles
2014 songs
Slash (musician) songs
Songs written by Slash (musician)
Songs written by Myles Kennedy
Song recordings produced by Michael Baskette